Wouter Marinus (born 18 February 1995) is a Dutch professional footballer who plays as a midfielder for amateur side ZZVV Zuidwolde. He formerly played for PEC Zwolle.

External links
 
 

1995 births
Living people
People from De Wolden
Association football midfielders
Dutch footballers
Netherlands youth international footballers
PEC Zwolle players
FC Emmen players
Eredivisie players
Footballers from Drenthe